Wang Chen (born 27 February 1990) is a Chinese male high jumper, who won an individual gold medal at the 2007 World Youth Championships in Athletics.

References

External links

1990 births
Living people
Chinese male high jumpers
21st-century Chinese people